Onze de Setembre is a Barcelona Metro station named after Rambla Onze de Setembre, one of the main streets in the neighbourhood of Sant Andreu de Palomar where it is located, part of Barcelona's district of Sant Andreu. It was opened with the opening of the L9/L10 section between Bon Pastor and La Sagrera stations on 26 June 2010. It is served by TMB-operated Barcelona Metro lines L9 and L10.

Layout
The station is located exactly under the intersection of Rambla Onze de Setembre with Virgili street and was built like many other new L9 metro stations with a 31-meter depth and 30 meter diameter well. It is divided in three levels: the upper hall, the upper platform and the lower platform. The upper hall has an only access from the street equipped with escalators and elevators, making the station accessible for disabled persons. The upper hall has also ticket vending machines and a TMB Control Center. The upper platform is where run the trains toward La Sagrera and the lower platform is where run the trains toward Can Zam and Gorg stations. The architectural design of the station was designed by architect Tomàs Morató. There is a backlit mural by Àlex Ollé and Alfons Flores that covers most part of the station's well and represents the existing mood status.

Gallery

References

External links

 L9 metro station listing at TMB website
 L10 metro station listing at TMB website
 Information and photos about the station at Trenscat.com
 Photo gallery of the station under construction

Railway stations in Spain opened in 2010
Transport in Sant Andreu
Barcelona Metro line 9 stations
Barcelona Metro line 10 stations